Jackie Fabulous (born Jacqueline J. Champagnie) is an American stand-up comedian and actress. Her career has involved several performances on television, including two televisions series that she wrote, as well as appearing on  America's Got Talent in 2019.

Life and career
Fabulous was born in The Bronx, New York, the daughter of a Jamaican immigrant family. She graduated from Trinity Law School.  Her first comedy performance at the Hollywood Improv, in 2005. She has been featured on the Arsenio Hall Show, Kevin Hart's LOL Network, Last Comic Standing, Gotham Comedy Live and more. In 2019, she entered the 14th season of the reality competition show America's Got Talent, finishing as a semi-finalist.

Filmography 

As Actress

Works and publications 
 Find Your Fabulous 
 Who Is Jackie Fabulous? (Comedy album)
 Relatable with Jackie Fabulous (Podcast)
 Fabulously Naughty (Comedy album)

References

External links
 
 

1970 births
American stand-up comedians
21st-century American comedians
American film actresses
American television actresses
American women comedians
Living people
American people of Jamaican descent
21st-century American actresses
America's Got Talent contestants